Peggy Webber (born September 15, 1925) is an American actress and writer who has worked in film, stage, television, and radio.

Early years
The daughter of a wildcat oil driller, Webber was born in Laredo, Texas.

In 1942, she graduated from Tucson High School, where she was active in dramatics. Before she was 3 years old, she was entertaining audiences at intermission times in movie theaters.

Film
Her screen debut came in the 1946 film Her Adventurous Night. She played Lady Macduff in Orson Welles' adaptation of Macbeth. Her other notable roles include Mrs. Alice Rice in the 1952 film Submarine Command and Miss Dennerly in The Wrong Man, directed by Alfred Hitchcock.

Radio
Webber debuted on radio at age 12 on WOAI (AM) in San Antonio, Texas. Her vocal talents for radio were highlighted in Time magazine's August 5, 1946, issue. The Radio: Vocal Varieties article noted, "In three years, her latex voice has supplied radio with 150 different characters on some 2,500 broadcasts."

Programs on which she was heard included The Dreft Star Playhouse, Dragnet, The Woman in My House, Pete Kelly's Blues, Dr. Paul, The Damon Runyon Theater, and The Man Called X. In 1979, she played many characters on Sears Radio Theater.

She is the founder of California Artists Radio Theatre.

The September 8, 2019, episode of The Big Broadcast highlighted her career and included a recent interview in which she mentioned her current projects.

Television
Webber appeared on a number of television programs. She portrayed Elise Sandor in Kings Row on ABC in 1955–56.

She also played abused sister Flora Stencil in the 1957 episode of Gunsmoke in the episode "Cheap Labor".

Writing, directing, and producing
Webber wrote and directed "some 250 stage plays, radio and television programs." She was writer and producer for Treasures of Literature, an early television program. In her later years, she was responsible for writing, directing, and producing "hundreds of new audio programs."

Recognition
Webber received the 2014 Norman Corwin Award for Excellence in Audio Theatre, "which celebrates a lifetime of achievement in this sonic art." She was the first woman so honored. Her program Treasure of Literature was named "Most Popular Television Program – 1949" by the Television Academy.

Filmography

References

External links
 
Peggy Webber at the RadioGOLDINdex

1925 births
Living people
20th-century American actresses
21st-century American actresses
American radio actresses
American film actresses
American television actresses
People from Laredo, Texas
Actresses from Texas
Tucson High School alumni